The Ukrainian Museum of Canada is a network of museums across Canada that promote Ukrainian cultural life, with a particular focus on experiences of the Canadian Ukrainian diaspora.

Background 
The Ukrainian Museum of Canada is a network of museums across Canada that promote Ukrainian cultural life. The headquarters of the network is in Saskatoon, where the first museum was established in 1941 by the Ukrainian Women's Association of Canada. One of the co-founders was the activist and writer Savella Stechishin. Originally it was housed in the Mohyla Ukrainian Institute, before moving to its own building in 1980. 

The Edmonton branch was the next to be established, in 1944.

Locations 

The museum network has branches in Saskatoon, Winnipeg, Toronto, Edmonton, Calgary and Vancouver. The museums have collections that specialise in folk art, textiles and social history objects relating to the experiences of Ukrainian Canadians. In 2020 the Toronto branch jointly curated an exhibition on beadwork with the Native Canadian Centre of Toronto.

In 2022, in response to the Russian invasion of Ukraine, the museums noted increased visitor numbers and interest in their collections.

List of museums 

 Ukrainian Museum of Canada, Alberta Branch
 Ukrainian Museum of Canada, Calgary Collection
 Ukrainian Museum of Canada, Manitoba Branch
 Ukrainian Museum of Canada, Ontario Branch
 Ukrainian Museum of Canada, Saskatoon

References 

Museum associations and consortia
Ukrainian-Canadian culture
Ukrainian museums in Canada